Tara Karsian (born August 5, 1965) is an American actress and writer. She is the daughter of actress Pat Carroll.

Early life
Born in Los Angeles, Karsian is the daughter of actress Pat Carroll and Lee Karsian.

Career 
Karsianbegan her career appearing in episodes of Married... with Children, Who's the Boss?, Designing Women, Walker, Texas Ranger, and The X Files, along with recurring roles on the short-lived sitcoms Baby Talk, and Life's Work. In 2000s, Karsian also played many small parts on television series such as NYPD Blue, Desperate Housewives, CSI: Crime Scene Investigation, and Prison Break.

Karsian was regular cast member in the unaired HBO series, 12 Miles of Bad Road starring Lily Tomlin and Mary Kay Place. She had the recurring role as Liz Dade in the NBC medical drama, ER from 2005 to 2009. Her film credits include The Number 23, Single White Female, Envy, and Boys Life 3. In 2008, Karsian appeared as Sister Vivian in the independent film Ready? OK!. In 2009, she acted in the comedy play Women Behind Bars at the Celebration Theatre in Los Angeles.

Karsian has co-written and co-starred with Andrea Grano in the 2014 independent comedy film BFFs, which featured her mother, Pat Carroll.

Filmography

Film

Television

References

External links

1965 births
Living people
20th-century American actresses
21st-century American actresses
Actresses from Los Angeles
American film actresses
American stage actresses
American television actresses
People from Greater Los Angeles
Beverly Hills High School alumni